Ballingall is a surname. Notable people with the surname include:

Chris Ballingall (born 1932), player in the All-American Girls Professional Baseball League
George Ballingall (1780–1855), Scottish physician and surgeon
Sara Ballingall (born  1972/1973), Canadian actress